Anne Bailey (1742–1825) was a British-born American storyteller and frontier scout.

Anne Bailey may also refer to:

Anne Bailey (ten-pin bowling) (born 1951), British-born ten-pin bowling champion
Anne Howard Bailey (1924–2006), American writer

See also
Bailey (surname)